Kings County Distillery is a distillery located at the Brooklyn Navy Yard in Brooklyn, New York City. It produces corn whiskey, bourbon whiskey, and rye whiskey, as well as other American craft whiskeys.

History 
Kings County Distillery was founded by Colin Spoelman and David Haskell in 2009, spurred by changes in New York State law regarding the licensing of microdistilleries.  It officially began production out of its  warehouse in April 2010.

In 2012, the distillery moved into the Brooklyn Navy Yard and installed copper whiskey stills imported from Scotland. The distillery focuses on American whiskeys, being named part of America's New Whiskey Rebellion by Whiskey Advocate, with unusual whiskeys like a Peated Bourbon, American Single Malt, and a craft Bottled in bond bourbon. The distillery also makes Empire Rye, a project to establish a new standard of identity for New York made rye with other craft distillers.

In 2016, Kings County Distillery opened The Gatehouses, a tasting room in the historic Sands Street gate of the Brooklyn Navy Yard.

In 2020, Kings County Distillery released their oldest Bourbon whiskey yet as a limited-edition 7-year-old single barrel whiskey, to coincide with its 10th-year birthday celebration.

Products
Kings County began by releasing an unaged corn whiskey, and later had a wider portfolio of whiskeys aged 2–5 years. 
 Kings County Moonshine
 Kings County Straight Bourbon Whiskey
 Kings County Peated Bourbon
 Kings County Single Malt Whiskey
 Kings County Bottled-in-Bond Bourbon
 Kings County Empire Rye
 Kings County Chocolate Whiskey

Awards
In 2016, Kings County Distillery was named "Distillery of the Year" by the American Distilling Institute.

References 

Companies based in Brooklyn
American companies established in 2009
Food and drink companies established in 2009
Distilleries in New York (state)
Brooklyn Navy Yard
Microdistilleries
Food and drink companies based in New York City